The Frumușeaua is a right tributary of the river Vișeu in Romania. It discharges into the Vișeu near Petrova.

References

Rivers of Romania
Rivers of Maramureș County